The Royal Exchange Hotel (locally known as the 'RE') is a heritage-listed hotel located at 10 High Street, Toowong, Brisbane, Queensland, Australia.

The Royal Exchange Hotel is a popular with local office workers and also University of Queensland students due to its proximity to the university. It was known for its '$4 basics' (now $5) on Wednesdays, and Sundays night, these being the busiest nights of the week for University students and the like.

The Royal Exchange Hotel has a casual atmosphere, allowing casual attire. Food and drinks are served, catering for lunch, dinner and casual drinks from the bar. Car parking spaces are available.

History
The Royal Exchange Hotel was built in about 1886, designed by Brisbane architect Richard Gailey. The first licensee was William Robertson.

In 1917 Jim Cavill was the licensee of the Royal Exchange. He went on to be the pioneer of Surfers Paradise.

In August 2013, the Australian Pub Fund bought the hotel with a final offer between $35 million and $40 million.  This purchase is the biggest deal on record in Brisbane.

The pub featured in the 2007 film All My Friends Are Leaving Brisbane.

Heritage listing
The Royal Exchange is listed on the Brisbane Heritage Register. It is a prominent landmark in the centre of Toowong and has been an important part of social life in Toowong for over a century.

See also
 List of public houses in Australia

References

External links

Some historic shots of the Royal Exchange Hotel

Pubs in Brisbane
Toowong
Brisbane Local Heritage Register
Richard Gailey buildings
Hotel buildings completed in 1886